Mark Kevin Kafentzis (born June 30, 1958) is a former American football defensive back who played three seasons in the National Football League (NFL) with the Cleveland Browns and Baltimore/Indianapolis Colts. He was drafted by the Browns in the eighth round of the 1982 NFL Draft. He first enrolled at Columbia Basin College before transferring to the University of Hawaiʻi at Mānoa.

Early years
Kafentzis participated in high school football, wrestling and track for the Columbia High School Bombers of Richland, Washington. He earned All Big-Nine Conference and All-Area honors on offense and defense his senior year.

College career
Kafentzis first played college football for the Columbia Basin College Hawks. He garnered All-Conference defensive back and All-American recognition as a kick return specialist. The Hawks won the National Junior College Football Championship in 1978. He was inducted into the Columbia Basin College Athletics Wall of Fame in 2012. Kafentzis transferred to play for the Hawaii Rainbow Warriors from 1980 to 1981. He was redshirted in 1979. He was named to the "All-Rainbow Team" of the 1980s. Kafentzis was named the 58th best player in the school's history by the Honolulu Star-Bulletin in 2009.

Professional career
Kafentzis was selected by the Cleveland Browns with the 199th pick in the 1982 NFL Draft and played in nine games for the team during the 1982 season. He played in 31 games, starting fifteen, for the Baltimore/Indianapolis Colts from 1983 to 1984. He was released by the Colts on August 20, 1985.

Personal life
Kafentzis is the oldest of five brothers who played for the Hawaii Rainbow Warriors. His brothers Kurt, Kent and Kyle all signed with NFL teams. Mark was inducted into the Central Washington Sports Hall of Fame in 2004, the Northwest Athletic Conference Hall of Fame in 2012 and the Tri-Cities Sports Council Hall of Fame in 2003.

References

External links
College stats

Living people
1958 births
American football defensive backs
Columbia Basin Hawks football players
Hawaii Rainbow Warriors football players
Cleveland Browns players
Baltimore Colts players
Indianapolis Colts players
Players of American football from Washington (state)
People from Richland, Washington